Bleed Out is the 21st studio album by indie folk band the Mountain Goats, released on August 19, 2022, through Merge Records. The album was written between December 2020 and January 2021, and recorded immediately following this at Betty's in Chapel Hill, North Carolina. Bleed Out was produced by Alicia Bognanno of Bully. The album was preceded by the lead single "Training Montage".

Background and recording 
Mountain Goats frontman John Darnielle took inspiration from action films from the 1960s to the 1980s that he watched at his home in North Carolina towards the end of 2020. He then began writing songs, and in January 2021, was joined by bandmates Peter Hughes, Jon Wurster, and Matt Douglas at Betty's Studios near his home in Chapel Hill, where recording was completed within a week.

Music and lyrics 
According to music critic Robert Christgau, Bleed Out relies more heavily on electric guitars than Darnielle's preceding work, while the logically "allusive" lyrics portray characters, "good [or] bad", who are generally "on some edge or other in a culture stretched near the breaking point by greed and violence that have become commonplaces.

Track listing

Charts

References 

2022 albums
Merge Records albums
The Mountain Goats albums